Spanish singer-songwriter Rosalía has released three studio albums since her debut in 2017. This has resulted in three concert tours (two of them worldwide), and several live television and award shows performances, as well as headlining spots at music festivals. Upon the release of her debut album Los ángeles, Rosalía embarked on a 44-show concert cycle alongside Raül Refree that visited Spain, Portugal, Canada, the United States and Switzerland. She started to perform at small music and poetry festivals and flamenco-centered events.

Following Rosalía's breakthrough and entrance in the mainstream with "Malamente", she started to perform at bigger venues, was more frequently on television and at music festivals around Europe. To promote her second studio album El mal querer (2018), Rosalía partnered with Red Bull to hold a successful album release concert at Plaza de Colón, in Madrid. She parallelly became a frequent performer on the MTV stage, also attending several award shows. In 2019, Rosalía embarked on her second concert tour, El Mal Querer Tour. She performed 43 shows and visited several theatres and music festivals in South America, North America and Europe, including Coachella, Glastonbury and Lollapalooza among others and served as a headliner at BBK Live and Primavera Sound.

The release of her third studio album Motomami was accompanied by the virtual TikTok show Motomami Live which attracted over four million users. In 2022, Rosalía embarked on the Motomami World Tour to promote her newest record. It visited indoor arenas around Europe and the Americas in a 46-show run.

Concert tours

One-off concerts

Music festivals

Award shows

TV shows and specials

Radio shows and specials

Other live performances

Notes

References 

Rosalia
Live performances